Craig Alan Evans (born January 21, 1952) is an American biblical scholar. He is a prolific writer with 70 books and over 600 journal articles and reviews to his name.

Career
He earned his B.A in history and philosophy from Claremont McKenna College, a Master of Divinity from Western Baptist Seminary in Portland, Oregon, and his Master of Arts and Ph.D. in Biblical Studies from Claremont Graduate University in southern California.

He is John Bisagno Distinguished Professor of Christian Origins at Houston Baptist University. Prior to Houston Baptist, he was Payzant Distinguished Professor of New Testament and director of the graduate program at Acadia Divinity College in Wolfville, Nova Scotia, a visiting assistant professor of religious studies at McMaster University and a professor of biblical studies at Trinity Western University.

Evans served as editor of the Bulletin for Biblical Research from 1994 to 2005.

Fabricating Jesus 
Evans published the book Fabricating Jesus: How Modern Scholars Distort the Gospels in 2008.  In it, he criticizes current scholarship on the historical Jesus, accusing it of distorting the historical figure of Jesus, creating completely unhistorical images of Jesus of Nazareth.  The book is critical of scholars such as Bart D. Ehrman, the Jesus Seminar, Robert Eisenman, Morton Smith, James Tabor, Michael Baigent and Elaine Pagels, while also arguing against the use of New Testament apocrypha, which Evans considers late works with no historical value (Gospel of Thomas, Gospel of Peter, Egerton Gospel, Gospel of Judas and Gospel of Mary) or even modern forgeries (Secret Gospel of Mark). Another chapter of the book dismisses The Da Vinci Code of American novelist Dan Brown, which Evans (and all biblical scholars, in fact) sees as nothing more than a sensationalist stunt.

The book's "Advance Praise" section includes endorsements from several prominent scholars of the New Testament, such as James H. Charlesworth, Gerd Theissen, John P. Meier, Darrel L. Bock, Ben Witherington III and James D.G. Dunn.

Works

Books
Evans is the author or editor of over 50 books, some of which are listed below:
 
 
 
 
 
 
 
 
 
 
 
 
 
 
 
 
 
 
——— (2020). Jesus and the Manuscripts: What We Can Learn from the Oldest Texts.  Peabody, MA: Hendrickson Publishers. p. 575. ISBN 978-1-68307-360-4

Articles

References

External links
 

1952 births
20th-century Christian biblical scholars
21st-century Christian biblical scholars
Academic journal editors
American evangelicals
American biblical scholars
American critics of Islam
Claremont Graduate University alumni
Claremont McKenna College alumni
Critics of the Christ myth theory
Christian critics of Islam
Critics of Theosophy
Living people
Academic staff of McMaster University
New Testament scholars
Academic staff of Trinity Western University
Western Seminary alumni